Otello is an opera in three acts by Gioachino Rossini to an Italian libretto by  after William Shakespeare's play Othello, or The Moor of Venice; it was premiered in Naples, Teatro del Fondo, 4 December 1816.

The plot of the libretto differs greatly from Shakespeare's play in that it takes place wholly in Venice, not mainly on Cyprus, and the dramatic conflict develops in a different manner. The role of Iago is much less diabolical than Shakespeare's play or Verdi's 1887 opera Otello, which was also based on it. Shakespeare derived his play from the story Un Capitano Moro ("A Moorish Captain") by Cinthio, a disciple of Boccaccio, first published in 1565. In further contrast, the role of Roderigo, a sub-plot in Shakespeare and Verdi, is very prominent in Rossini's version—some of the most difficult and brilliant music being assigned to the character Rodrigo. The roles of Otello, Iago, and Rodrigo are all composed for the tenor voice.

Rossini's Otello is an important milestone in the development of opera as musical drama. It provided Verdi with a benchmark for his own adaptations of Shakespeare. A 1999 Opera Rara CD of the opera includes an alternative happy ending, a common practice with drama and opera at that period of the 19th century.

Performance history

19th century

The first performance took place at the Teatro del Fondo in Naples on 4 December 1816. It was first performed in Paris on 5 June 1821 at the Théâtre Italien (with Manuel García as Otello and Giuditta Pasta as Desdemona), in London on 16 May 1822 at the King's Theatre, and in New York on 7 February 1826 at the Park Theatre.

The role of Iago is indicated in the early scores as that of a tenor and was taken up in the early years by tenors Ciccimarra, Luigi Campitelli and Domenico Reina. Yet curiously, only three years after the premiere, Rossini adapted the role for the baritone voice and it was frequently sung thereafter by baritones, including the most renowned bel canto-era "secondo basso cantante", transitional baritones, and practicing Verdian baritones of the 19th century. During this period, Iago was assigned to the Italian sometimes-second-tenor, sometimes-baritone Giovanola at the Théâtre Italien in Paris on 26 July 1823 with Giuditta Pasta as Desdemona. The Spanish baritone (later pedagogue) Manuel García, Jr. sang the role on his family's trip to New York in 1826. The Italian baritone Ferdinando Lauretti sang it at Verona in 1827 and a review of this performance was dispatched to London's The Harmonicon, which mentions his "character of Iago, a part for a bass which was greatly improved by Rossini, during his engagement at your Italian opera." Domenico Cosselli sang the role at Turin's  in 1828, as did the Italian primo basso Federico Crespi (1833), Antonio Tamburini (from 1834), Luciano Fornasari (in 1844), Giovanni Belletti (in 1849), Joseph Tagliafico in 1850, Giorgio Ronconi (from 1851), Francesco Graziani (from 1869), and Antonio Cotogni (in 1869). French baritone Paul Barroilhet appeared in 1844 in Paris, where he interpolated the aria "" (transposed from C to B-flat) from Rossini's La donna del lago. His successor, Jean-Baptiste Faure, sang the role in 1871.

A French printed edition from 1823 shows Iago's part written in the bass clef.

20th century and beyond

After a long period of relative neglect, in the late 20th century the opera began once more to appear on the world's stages. A production by Pier Luigi Pizzi was given at the Rossini Opera Festival in Pesaro in 1988. The same production was performed at the Royal Opera House, Covent Garden, in 2000 with Bruce Ford, Mariella Devia, Juan Diego Flórez and Kenneth Tarver in leading roles.

In October 2012, Opera Southwest in Albuquerque, New Mexico, presented three performances of the opera. The first gave both the original and the alternative "happy" ending. Prior to the second performances, the audience voted for the ending they preferred, and the chosen version was then performed. Also in 2012, the opera was staged in Zürich by the Vlaamse Opera. The same production was given in Ghent and Antwerp in February and March 2014. Buxton Festival presented the opera in concert form in July 2014.

Otello was performed in a production at the Theater an der Wien and the Oper Frankfurt in 2019, with Enea Scala in the title role, cast by Damiano Michieletto as a successful Muslim Arab in today's Venetian business world, with Karolina Makuła and Nino Machaidze as Desdemona.

Roles

Synopsis

Place: Venice
Time: End of the 15th Century

According to the booklet of the performances of 1818 in Milan:

As in Verdi's Otello, Desdemona's aria "Salce" ("Willow Song") is a pivotal moment in the final act.

Related works
Franz Liszt based the Canzone from the Années de pèlerinage, supplement Venezia e Napoli, on the offstage gondolier's song "Nessun maggior dolore" from this opera.

Recordings

References
Notes

Sources

Further reading
Osborne, Charles (1994), The Bel Canto Operas of Rossini, Donizetti, and Bellini, Portland, Oregon: Amadeus Press. 
Osborne, Richard (1990), Rossini Ithaca, New York: Northeastern University Press. 
Senici, Emanuele (ed.) (2004), The Cambridge Companion to Rossini, Cambridge: Cambridge University Press.   
Servadio, Gaia (2003), Rossini, New York: Carroll & Graf Publishers. 
Toye, Francis (1997 re-print), Rossini: The Man and His Music, Dover Publications, 1987.  ,

External links

Operas by Gioachino Rossini
Italian-language operas
1816 operas
Operas
Operas set in Venice
Operas based on Othello